Raghadan is a forest located in Al Bahah Region, Kingdom of Saudi Arabia. It is long known for its ancient market, which is held every Sunday (Sunday Market) and it is one of the famous and commonly-frequented markets in the region.

Location 
Raghadan Forest is in Al Bahah Region, located in the Southwest of Saudi Arabia (in the northern hemisphere, situated between latitude 19–30 degree). It is located on the highway between Al-Baha and Taif city. Raghadan Forest is positioned on a cliff overlooking King Fahad Aqaba in Albaha at a height exceeding 1700m, the village of Zarqa separates it from Albaha city. Raghadan is 4 km away from the center of Albaha. It is located in the center of a group of villages, benefiting from the transport infrastructure in the area.

Festivals 
Festivals that are ongoing during the summer:

 Activities of Al-Kadi Baha 
 The international honey festival
 The southern dance festival
 The Baha summer festival
 The shopping bazaar festival
 Raghadan Islamic Forum 
 Raghadan Youth Forum
 The international circus festival
 The festival of productive families

Gallery

References 

Tourist attractions in Saudi Arabia